Endozoicomonas montiporae is a Gram-negative, rod-shaped and aerobic bacterium from the genus of Endozoicomonas which has been isolated from the coral Montipora aequituberculata.

References

External links
Type strain of Endozoicomonas montiporae at BacDive -  the Bacterial Diversity Metadatabase

Oceanospirillales
Bacteria described in 2010